Lyn Brown (born 1960) is an English politician and Member of Parliament (MP) for West Ham.

Lyn Brown may also refer to:

 Lynne Brown (born 1961), South African politician
 Monica Lin Brown (born 1988), US Army soldier and Silver Star recipient
 Lindsay Brown (baseball) (1911–1967), American baseball player